Nkonya is a town in the Oti Region of Ghana. As a state, it consists of nine towns namely Ahenkro, Asakyiri, Betenase, Kadjebi, Ntsumuru, Ntumda, Tayi, Tepo and Wurupong. The town is known for the Nkonya Senior High School.  The school is a second cycle institution.

The language spoken in the town and the area is the Nkonya language.

References

Populated places in the Oti Region